Seven Servants is a 1996 English-language German comedy-drama film directed by Daryush Shokof and written by Daryush Shokof and Juliane Schulze. The film is about a man named Archie, portrayed by Anthony Quinn, who wishes to unite and "connect" the races until his last breath.

The film premiered at the 1996 Locarno Film Festival.

Plot
A wealthy old man named Archie hires seven servants of both genders and different races to get connected to him by plugging his body openings and remain connected to him until his last breath. The servants are to stay connected to the old man's body for the next ten days. They eat, sleep, and even use the bathroom and fight thieves together. The party for his reunion with old friends is a lavish one. It includes the once love of his life (Hilda, portrayed by Alexandra Stewart), the one and only true friend he ever had (David Warner), and the Opera singer (Audra McDonald in her film debut) plus the maid (Sonja Kirchberger). The servants overcome many difficulties by staying "united which is the core reason for the whole ritual". The best friends are asked to fill up the remaining openings of his body. Hilda is set upon him to do the final act of love between the two of them, something they never ever did though they have loved each other most of their lives. She commits to the act. Then it is time for David Warner to plug up his rear hole, an act he refuses to deliver and the beautiful maid takes the responsibility on her shoulders and does the impossible act of filling his rear end hole instead of David Warner having to go through the pain. In the final scene where all his openings are filled up except for his mouth, it is time for the opera singer to plug up his facial opening while singing a most beautiful opera piece. She sings with the greatest heavenly voice by Audra McDonald into his mouth and thus takes the last breath away from him as she blocks his mouth with her lips hence delivering the last kiss of death and preventing Archie from ever breathing again. Archie dies in peace, in pleasure and harmony for he achieved unity of the races around him though he pays for this eternal obsession and desire with his life.

The plot is in actuality Shokof's own manifest of yekishim with which he believes the human beings have only come to earth to unite both in heart and mind. Archie ascends to the heavens while his round bed turns in circle and joins the skies and the stars in the universe peacefully. Unification prevails amongst the servants even though it is just a bodily experience and through him as the catalyst.

Cast
Anthony Quinn
David Warner
Alexandra Stewart
Sonja Kirchberger
Audra McDonald 
Johnathan Staci Kim
Reza Davoudi
Ken Ard
Gerald Moore

Music
Gato Barbieri composed the music for the film.

Reception
American Cinematographer wrote that it "presents a truly eccentric premise ... Seven Servants Iranian born director, Daryush Shokof, is a former painter whose experimental art videos were, he admits, 'too conceptual or philosophical to win mainstream acclaim.' This video work, however, gave him tremendous freedom to experiment with the camera, framing and lighting techniques that he applied to his first celluloid project."

David Rooney of the magazine Variety wrote, "If it didn't lapse midway into monotony, Seven Servants might have made its mark as a camp classic of high-art folly. This twaddle about an oldster drawing on youth and vitality by having an ethnically balanced bunch of hired hands jam their fingers in his ears and nostrils is just an elaborately embroidered account of going out with a bang."

MovieWeb wrote, "In this film from Iranian director Daryush Shokof, Anthony Quinn plays an elderly man who wants to exit earth in a state of unity with all creatures. To that end, he hires a quartet of manservants to plug his facial orifices with their fingers. Not your typical solution, but it seems to work for Archie (Quinn), who moves through the rest of the film thus connected. Audra McDonald appears in the final moments to sing a "death aria" into his mouth."

After Quinn's death, Contactmusic.com quoted Quinn as saying that Seven Servants was "really a film for the 21st century".  According to them, Quinn felt that the film was "too visionary" and should be withheld from release until the 21st century.  Referring to the film's delayed release, they said that it was "worth the wait".

References

 "Seven Servants" Der Spiegel 31/1995 vom 31.07.1995, p 166a
 "Quinn embraces tentacled role in Seven Servants," August 24, 1995, Daily News of Los Angeles
 Alex Witchel, published: July 6, 1995, The New York Times
 Eric Gutierrez, Aug. 6, 1996, Los Angeles Times
 Brook Comer, "Digital Manipulation takes new ....in ,Seven Servants", Dec.01, 1996, American Cinematographer

External links

Seven Servants at IFVC.com

1996 films
German comedy-drama films
1996 comedy-drama films
Films shot in Bavaria
English-language German films
1990s English-language films
Films directed by Daryush Shokof
1990s German films